Holloway Halstead Frost (April 11, 1889 - January 26, 1935), born in Brooklyn, New York, 
was an American World War I Navy officer and Navy Cross recipient.

Naval career
Frost was a member of the U.S. Naval Academy class of 1910.
A widely published author, his work ranged the gamut of naval subjects, from history to operational analysis to ship-handling. His naval career was as distinguished as his literary; he not only was a designated naval aviator, but was also qualified for command in submarines.
He was awarded the Navy Cross for his World War I service as aide to Commander, American Patrol Detachment, Atlantic Fleet, a billet in which he played a significant role in developing the tactics of surface and air forces in combined operations against submarines. 

Commander Frost died January 26, 1935, at Kansas City, Missouri, while a member of the staff of the Command and General Staff School, Fort Leavenworth, Kansas.

Namesake
USS Frost (DE-144) was named in his honor. The ship was launched March 21, 1943, by Consolidated Steel Corp., Orange, Texas; sponsored by Mrs. Holloway H. Frost, widow of Commander Frost; and commissioned August 30, 1943, Lieutenant Commander T. S. Lank in command.

References

Recipients of the Navy Cross (United States)
United States Navy officers
United States Navy personnel of World War I
1889 births
1935 deaths
United States Naval Academy alumni
People from Brooklyn
Military personnel from New York City